Zach Taylor, better known by his stage name Dreamer Boy, is an American singer-songwriter originally from Spokane, Washington and currently based in Nashville, Tennessee. While in Nashville, Taylor went to Belmont University for college. On November 13, 2018, he released his debut album Love, Nostalgia, preceded by the singles "Falling for the Wrong One", "Orange Girl", and "Fever". His second album All the Ways We Are Together was released on April 22, 2021 (Earth Day). The album was promoted by five singles "Know You", "Crybaby", "Don't Be a Fool", "Easier Said Than Done" and "Let's Hold Hands". Since his debut, he has toured along with other artists, such as Still Woozy, The Marías, and Omar Apollo, as well as performed as the opening act for BENEE and Clairo.

Discography

Albums

Singles

Promotional singles

References

Living people
American singer-songwriters
Bedroom pop musicians
Singer-songwriters from Washington (state)
Belmont University alumni
Harvest Records artists
Year of birth missing (living people)